McGlinchey Stafford is an American law firm focusing on corporate defense litigation. Headquartered in New Orleans, the firm employs more than 170 lawyers and has offices in 14 cities in 9 states plus the District of Columbia.

History 
The firm was founded in New Orleans in 1974 by Dermot S. McGlinchey and Graham Stafford.  It began as a small group in a single downtown New Orleans office.  The firm is ranked on The National Law Journal's list of the 350 largest law firms in the United States. The firm serves a variety of clients, from Fortune 500 companies to entrepreneurs and government entities.

In 2005, the firm launched the CAFA Law Blog, the first blog to focus exclusively on the Class Action Fairness Act of 2005.

During Hurricane Katrina, the firm implemented an emergency plan it had drafted after the September 11 attacks and secured additional office space and 41 apartments in Baton Rouge for displaced attorneys and staff.

Offices
  Albany, NY
  Baton Rouge, LA
  Birmingham, AL
  Cleveland, OH
  Dallas, TX
  Fort Lauderdale, FL
  Houston, TX
  Irvine, CA
  Jackson, MS
 Nashville, TN
  Jacksonville, FL
  New Orleans, LA
  New York City, NY
  Washington D.C.

References

External links
McGlinchey Stafford website

Economy of Baton Rouge, Louisiana
Economy of Cleveland
Economy of Dallas
Economy of Houston
Economy of New Orleans
Law firms established in 1974
Companies based in New Orleans
Law firms based in Louisiana